Shiskine is a small village on the Isle of Arran in the Firth of Clyde, Scotland. The village is within the parish of Kilmory. Sitting further up the "Shiskine Valley" from the village of Blackwaterfoot, the village takes its name from a corruption of the Gaelic for "marshy place".  Much of the area was essentially a swamp years ago, but now comprises farm land.

The village has its own primary school and local church. There is a possible hillfort at Cnoc Ballygowan close by to the village, though its antiquity is disputed. Shiskine is close to the peaks of Beinn Nuis and Beinn Bharrain.

References

External links

Canmore - Arran, Shiskine, General site record
Canmore - Arran, Blackwaterfoot, Shiskine Golf Course site record

Villages in the Isle of Arran